Solomon Levy (born 18 May 1886, death date unknown) was an English cricketer. A right-handed batsman and right-arm off break spin bowler born in Stroud, Levy played four County Championship matches for Gloucestershire between July 1910 and July 1911. Primarily a bowler, he took four wickets at a bowling average of 36.75, and scored 43 runs at a batting average of 7.16.

References
Notes

Sources
 
 

1886 births
Date of death unknown
Cricketers from Stroud
English cricketers of 1890 to 1918
English cricketers
Gloucestershire cricketers